Dorota Aqualiteja Rabczewska (born 15 February 1984), known professionally as Doda, is a Polish singer-songwriter, actress, producer, and television personality. A two-time MTV Europe Music Award winner, she is among the most successful Polish artists in terms of number of prizes won. Doda is notable for her innovative and controversial performances and music videos. She rose to fame as a member of the Polish rock band Virgin, with whom she released three studio albums: Virgin (2002), Bimbo (2004), and the triple platinum Ficca (2005). After the group disbanded in 2007, she continued as a solo artist, releasing two platinum albums: Diamond Bitch (2007) and 7 pokus głównych (2011). In 2016, Virgin reunited and released their fourth studio album Choni. In 2018, Doda made her acting debut in the feature film Pitbull. Last Dog, and the following year, she released her third solo studio album Dorota.

Doda was featured on CNN's 2008 list of the 10 most famous Poles in history. She was also included on the list of the 50 best Polish female singers compiled by Machina in 2010, while Polish magazine Viva! listed her among the 10 most influential women in Poland in 2011. Wprost named Doda one of the 100 most influential Poles in 2011, and one of the 50 most influential Poles in 2019. She was also featured on its lists of the 50 most influential Polish celebrities, and the 50 most influential Polish women, in 2015 and 2017, respectively. Forbes Poland included Doda in its annual ranking of the 100 most-valuable stars of Polish show business every year from 2006 to 2014 when it ceased.

In 2011, Helen Pidd of The Guardian named Doda one of the most successful and one of the most controversial Polish musical artists of all time. She received 1 triple platinum, 6 platinum and 5 gold certification for her albums and singles sales in Poland.

Life and career

Early life
Dorota Rabczewska was born in Ciechanów, Poland. In her youth, she was coached in athletics for four years (long jump, 100 metres). She won the Voivodeship Championships for 100 and 60 meters, long jump and shot put. She also won bronze in the Polish Championships. She then quit sports for musical career. She made her professional debut as a teenager in 1998, at the Buffo Theatre in Warsaw in the musical Metro. Simultaneously, she took singing lessons from Elżbieta Zapendowska, one of the most famous singing coaches in Poland.

2000–2006: Virgin era 
After auditioning at the age of 16, Doda became the vocalist for the Polish hard rock band Virgin. In 2002, they made their debut by releasing their first studio album titled Virgin. It was promoted by two singles: "To Ty" and "Mam tylko Ciebie". To promote the band and the album further, Doda took part in the Polish version of the reality TV series called The Bar.

Two years after their debut, the band released their second studio album called Bimbo. It was released on 17 May 2004. The album debuted at number one on the Polish Album Sales Chart. The lead single, "Dżaga", became their first mainstream hit. In its music video, Doda and her future husband Radosław Majdan – Polish goalkeeper are seen having sex. The next singles were ballads "Kolejny raz" and "Nie zawiedź mnie". To promote Bimbo Virgin embarked on their first concert tour Bimbo Tour.

After a line-up change the group performed their new single, a power-ballad "Znak pokoju", at the Sopot International Song Festival and won its Viewers' Choice Award. It was also their breakthrough hit on the radio. On 17 October 2005, they released their third studio album called Ficca, this time with more radio-friendly pop-rock sound. It was promoted during their second concert tour called Ficca Tour. The next single was the ballad "2 bajki", another huge hit in their career.

In April 2006, Doda was rushed to hospital due to a problem with her intervertebral disc making the band fall into a hiatus for a while. After having a complicated spine surgery, she made her return with the voice role of Abba in the Polish-language version of the animated film Asterix and the Vikings. Later that year, the group released their new hit titled "Szansa", which was inspired by Doda's surgery. The song won the Grand Prix of the National Festival of Polish Song in Opole. They also released the reissue of Ficca, which spent six weeks at number one on the Polish Album Sales Chart, and sold over 100,000 copies becoming their best-selling album. Ficca was certified triple platinum by the Polish Society of the Phonographic Industry (ZPAV).

By the end of 2006, Doda parted ways with her manager. On 1 January 2007, Virgin's founder and guitarist, Tomasz Lubert, announced the group's disbandment.

2007–2010: Solo career and Diamond Bitch era 

In 2007, Doda signed a solo contract with Universal Music Poland. On 27 July, she released her first solo studio album Diamond Bitch. It was preceded by the single, "Katharsis", which was released in June. To promote the album Doda embarked on her first solo concert tour called Diamond Tour; some concerts took place outside Poland, in Germany, the United Kingdom and the United States. The album went straight to number one on the Polish Album Sales Chart, and stayed there for five consecutive weeks. It also charted on Billboards European Top 100 Albums chart. The album received platinum certification from ZPAV for sales of over 45,000 units. "To jest to" was chosen as the second single to promote the album, but the biggest hit, "Nie daj się", was released in June 2008. It received huge radio airplay, and topped many radio charts. It remains the biggest hit in Doda's solo career. In August 2008, Doda released the reissue of Diamond Bitch. Later that year, she made a cameo as herself in the film Serce na dłoni directed by Krzysztof Zanussi. In 2009, two final singles from Diamond Bitch were released: "Rany" and "Dziękuję".

During the Diamond Bitch era, Doda won ten VIVA Comet Awards. She won the Video of the Year award three years in a row, and also received the Artist of the Decade special award. She is the recipient of two MTV Europe Music Awards for Best Polish Act, and came second in the Best European Act category in 2009. At the 2008 National Festival of Polish Song in Opole, Doda was awarded the Best Artist Superjedynka Award.

She embarked on the Rock'n'Roll Palace Tour in March 2010, which lasted a year.

2010–2013: 7 pokus głównych era

In June 2010, Doda released the English-language version of the first single from her second studio album, "Bad Girls". In July, the Polish-language version of the song was released. "Bad Girls" became a big hit, particularly in 2011, after the premiere of its big-budget music video, delayed due to the illness of her then-fiancé Nergal, leader of the death metal group Behemoth, who battled leukaemia. Doda's second studio album, 7 pokus głównych, was released on 30 May 2011. This time Doda presented a brand new electro-rock music style. The album was released with seven different covers, each representing different temptation. It sold over 30,000 copies, and was certified platinum by ZPAV. Songs from the album were also recorded in English, and were meant to be released internationally under the title The 7 Temptations. However, the material remains unreleased. Only a few demos were either uploaded onto Doda's official YouTube channel or her official website. These include "Let's Get It Started", "My Way or No Way", "XXX", and "Singing in the Chains" which earned Doda a 2014 World Music Award nomination for World's Best Song. 7 pokus głównych was promoted during Doda's third headling tour, The Seven Temptations Tour, which began in May 2011, and lasted a year and a half. "XXX" was the second single released from 7 pokus głównych. In November 2011, Doda became a columnist for the Polish edition of Maxim magazine, writing for its first two issues In December, she posed for Playboy USA.

In February 2012, Doda released the song "Kac Wawa", a theme from the Polish comedy movie of the same name. Also in February, Doda won VIVA Comet Award for Video of the Year for "XXX". By doing so, she surpassed the record previously held by Tokio Hotel and herself, and became the only artist in the world to win 12 VIVA Comet Awards. It was also Doda's fourth Video of the Year award. In June, she released a collaboration with her best friend and impersonator Dżaga titled "Twa Energia". At the end of 2012, another single from 7 pokus głównych was released. It was a collaboration with Polish rap legend Fokus, "Fuck It". Its controversial music video with scenes of violence between both artists was banned on TV. However, it managed to gain popularity on the internet, and amassed over one million views on YouTube within the first 24 hours of its premiere. The last single from the album was the haunty electro-ballad titled "Electrode", released in 2013.

2013–2020: Concert albums, acting, Virgin reunion and Dorota

In December 2012, Doda signed a record deal with EMI Music Poland (since 2014 part of Warner Music Poland). In May 2013, she embarked on the Fly High Tour – the first in her career to be filmed, and released on a DVD as Fly High Tour – Doda Live. In October 2013, Doda released the single titled "Wkręceni (High Life)" for the Polish comedy movie Wkręceni.

Doda soon left Warner Music, and by December 2014, she re-signed with Universal Music Poland. On the New Year's Eve 2014, she released the single "Riotka", which was later certified platinum by ZPAV. Its English-language version was recorded and released as "Not Over You". In May 2015, Doda embarked on her fifth solo concert tour, Riotka Tour. One of its concerts was filmed in November 2016, and released on a DVD in 2017. On 25 June 2015, she released the single "Nie pytaj mnie". It went on to receive a gold certification from ZPAV. Both "Riotka" and "Nie pytaj mnie" were written by Chelcee Grimes who previously worked with Kylie Minogue and The Saturdays. In October 2015, Doda's manager announced that the songs would remain stand-alone singles, and would not be included on her third studio album as she decided to take a different musical direction. Their live versions were included on the concert album from Riotka Tour.

On 20 November 2015, Doda performed with Slash at his concert from World on Fire World Tour which took place in Poland. She sang "Sweet Child o' Mine" accompanied by Slash on the guitar. In May 2016, she was cast as Angelica in IMKA Theatre's play called Słownik Ptaszków Polskich. In August 2016, Virgin announced their reunion. That same month, they released their first single in ten years, "Hard Heart". In November, Virgin released their fourth studio album Choni. Its most successful single, "Kopiuj-wklej", was certified gold in Poland.

In 2017, Doda guest starred in the TV series Daleko od noszy. Reanimacja as Aniela. The following year, she starred in the feature film Pitbull. Last Dog directed by Władysław Pasikowski, which she also co-produced. She played Mira, and received favourable reviews for her performance. Her third solo studio album, Dorota, was released in 2019. It peaked at number four in Poland.

2021–present: Dziewczyny z Dubaju and new music
Doda produced the film Dziewczyny z Dubaju in 2021. That year, she released the singles "Don't Wanna Hide", "Fake Love" and "Melodia ta". In 2022, she was the main protagonist of a reality show Doda. 12 kroków do miłości (Doda. 12 Steps to Love) aired on Polsat.

Personal life 

Doda was born to Paweł Rabczewski (a weightlifter) and Wanda. She has a nine-year-older half-brother Rafał with the same mother. He was her road manager. She also has a twelve-year-older half-brother Grzegorz and sixteen-year-younger half-sister Paulina with the same father.

In 2003, she met her future husband Polish goalkeeper, Radosław Majdan. He later proposed to her during their vacation in Jerusalem, Israel, and they were married on 5 March 2005. Three years later, in May 2008, the couple divorced.

On 9 May 2009, it became public that she had a relationship with the frontman of the extreme metal band Behemoth, Adam Darski (aka Nergal). In December 2009, the couple got engaged. Darski was diagnosed with leukemia, Doda offered her own bone marrow for transplant but it did not match. Doda appealed to the wider public for marrow donations, which resulted in great public response and Darski receiving the right transplant and recovering from the illness. In March 2011, it was reported that the couple had called off the engagement, and broken up. That same year, Doda started dating a choreographer Błażej Szychowski. Since 2014, she was in a relationship with a businessman Emil Haidar. In July 2015, they got engaged, but in November of that year, Doda announced that they were no longer together.

On 14 April 2018, she married film producer Emil Stępień in a private ceremony in Marbella, Spain. They got engaged the previous year, but they did not confirm their relationship until they were already married. Doda filed for divorce in 2021, which was finalised that same year. She is a member of Mensa Poland.

Blasphemy charges 

In May 2010, the Warsaw prosecutor's office charged Doda with the crime of "offending religious sensibilities" for remarking in a year-earlier television interview that she believed more in dinosaurs than she did in the Bible because "it is hard to believe in something written by people who drank too much wine and smoked weed". In January 2012, she was found guilty and fined 5,000 złoty by local court Warszawa-Mokotów. Her appeal was not effective. In June 2012, district court in Warsaw upheld the verdict of the local court.

Some of Polish public persons, such as politician Włodzimierz Cimoszewicz, philosopher Wojciech Krysztofiak, pharmacologist Jerzy Vetulani and members of Palikot's Movement criticized the judgment. Doda commented that "she was a victim of Polish anachronistic jurisdiction" and submitted the case to European Court of Human Rights, which was accepted for consideration in 2017.

Discography

 Diamond Bitch (2007)
 7 pokus głównych (2011)
 Dorota (2019)
 Aquaria (2022)

Concert tours
 Diamond Tour (2007–2010)
 Rock'n'Roll Palace Tour (2010–2011)
 The Seven Temptations Tour (2011–2013)
 Fly High Tour (2013–2015)
 Anty Tour (2014–2018)
 Riotka Tour (2015–2018)
 Doda with Orchestra (2019–2020)

 As guest act
 Slash' World on Fire World Tour (2015; Łodź, Poland)
 Królowie życia. 40-lecie Skawiński & Tkaczyk (2016; Warsaw, Poland)
 Maryla Rodowicz' Diva Tour (2017; 2 shows)

Filmography

Awards

See also 
Music of Poland

References

External links 

1984 births
Living people
People from Ciechanów
Universal Music Group artists
Mensans
Polish pop singers
Polish rock singers
English-language singers from Poland
21st-century Polish singers
21st-century Polish women singers
MTV Europe Music Award winners
Association footballers' wives and girlfriends